Coleophora murciana is a moth of the family Coleophoridae. It is found in Spain, Portugal, France and on Sardinia.

References

murciana
Moths described in 1960
Moths of Europe